Ariocarpus kotschoubeyanus is a species of plant in the family Cactaceae.

It is endemic to Coahuila and Nuevo León states, and southwards into Querétaro state,  in northeastern Mexico.

Its natural habitat is hot deserts.

It was named after the noble Kochubey family. It is threatened by habitat loss.

References

External links

Kotschoubeyanus
Cacti of Mexico
Endemic flora of Mexico
Flora of Coahuila
Flora of Nuevo León
Flora of Querétaro
Near threatened biota of Mexico
Taxonomy articles created by Polbot